"From a Distance" is a song written in 1985 by American singer-songwriter Julie Gold. Gold was working as a secretary at the time for HBO and writing songs in her free time. Gold's friend, Christine Lavin, introduced the song to Nanci Griffith, who first recorded it for her 1987 album, Lone Star State of Mind.

The song was covered a number of times, with the most successful being a version by Bette Midler which became a major hit in 1990.

Interpretation
Julie Gold has stated that she believes in an immanent and beneficent God, and also thinks that people have a right to interpret the song any way they want, as with all art. She has stated that the song is about the difference between how things appear to be and how they really are.

Original Nanci Griffith version

Nanci Griffith recorded it first in her 1987 album Lone Star State of Mind. Nanci Griffith stated that a songwriter Julie Gold sent her the song in 1986, asking Griffith what was wrong with it, as Gold had sent it to many artists and record companies but none wanted to record it. Griffith answered that she loved it so much the moment she heard it and that she wanted to hear it performed personally by Gold. This established a relationship between the two with Griffith being the first to record "From a Distance" in her Lone Star State of Mind album.

Griffith performed it live many times and a version of her live performance on August 19–20, 1988 at the Anderson Fair, a Houston, Texas club long known for featuring folk artists in an intimate setting, appeared in her live album One Fair Summer Evening.

The Griffith version charted only in Ireland, where her version became a sleeper hit, spending 17 non-consecutive weeks in the Irish Top 30 during 1988, peaking at number nine in April.

Track listing
 Ireland 7" (MCA 1169)
 "From a Distance"
 "Sing One For Sister"

Charts

Bette Midler version

"From a Distance" became an international commercial success after it was covered by American singer Bette Midler for her seventh studio album, Some People's Lives (1990). World events at this time gave the song a resonance as an anthem during the Gulf War. It reached number one on the US Billboard Adult Contemporary chart and number two on the Billboard Hot 100. The song went on to win a Grammy for Song of the Year in 1991 and a "3 Million Airs Award" from Broadcast Music Incorporated. The song also reached the top 10 in Australia, Canada, Ireland, and New Zealand. In the United Kingdom, the song peaked at number six following a re-release in 1991.

Midler re-recorded a Christmas edition for her 2006 Christmas album, Cool Yule, with additional lyrics by Los Angeles native Jay Landers. Additional recordings of the original have been performed by Gold, Griffith, Simon Nicol (of Fairport Convention) and many others.

Critical reception
Larry Flick from Billboard described "From a Distance" as a "soothing hymn that invokes inspirational images similar to "Wind Beneath My Wings", adding that the song "proves that the Divine Miss M still has what it takes to tackle top 40 territory." Hannsjörg Riemann from German Bravo gave Midler's version two out of three, viewing it as a "tearjerker". He added, "The scandal noodle of the US show scene has a great voice, as can also be seen here. Leisurely tempo, pleasant melody, medium strong arrangement." Alison Mayes from Calgary Herald called it a "sure-hit", saying that it "should have been done by Whitney Houston". 

Dave Sholin from the Gavin Report felt the singer's Grammy for "Wind Beneath My Wings" "reaffirmed her innate ability to extract every single ounce of emotion out of a song. Teaming once again with producer Arif Mardin, she seems right at home with a tune that has much of the same quality as her giant hit of last year. Bette's certain to go the distance again." Gene Sandbloom from The Network Forty found that the lyrics "manage to take in the globe (with a minimum of sugar) and deliver a song worth listening to a hundred times. The music, produced by sound specialist Arif Mardin, is a slow crescendo made to support Midler's voice without overwhelming." He added that she "again uses her "no frills" vocal approach which makes this song so genuine."

Retrospective response
In an 2020 retrospective review, Matthew Hocter from Albumism stated that the song "showcases her magnificent vocality, coupled with lyrics entrenched in hope and peace." Conversely, Midler's recording of the song ranked at number 37 on VH1's list of the "50 Most Awesomely Bad Songs Ever." and ranked at number 14 on Blender Magazine's list of "The 50 Worst Songs Ever". Criticisms focus on the song's lyrical content and the production of Midler's version.

Track listings
 US 7-inch and cassette single (7-87820; 4-87820)
 UK 7-inch and cassette single (A 7820; A 7820C)
 Japanese mini-CD single (AMDY-5032)
 "From a Distance" – 4:37
 "One More Round" – 2:01

 UK 12-inch and CD single (A 7820T; A7820CD)
 "From a Distance"
 "One More Round"
 "Wind Beneath My Wings"
 "The Rose"

Charts

Weekly charts
Original version

Christmas version

Year-end charts

Certifications

Release history

Cliff Richard version

The song was simultaneously released by Cliff Richard in October 1990 (around the same time of the release of Midler's version) from a similarly titled album From a Distance: The Event reaching number 11 in the UK Singles Charts and number 16 in Ireland.

In 1999, on his "40th Anniversary Tour" as a recording artist, Richard opened his concert in Royal Albert Hall with the song.

Track listings
 UK 7"/UK Picture Disc (EMI EM 155/EMI EMPD 155)
 "From a Distance"
 "Lindsay Jane II"

 UK CD single/UK 12" (EMI CDEM 155/EMI 12EM 155)
 "From a Distance"
 "Lindsay Jane II"
 "Wired for Sound" (live)

Charts

Magdalene Survivors Together charity version

"From a Distance" became a 2011 charity single in support of Magdalene Survivors Together, a charity set in July 2009 by Gerard Boland focusing on the human rights aspect of the Magdalene Laundries in Ireland. The 2011 single had vocal participation from several artists: Sinéad O'Connor, Tommy Fleming, Brian Kennedy, Daniel O'Donnell, Ann Scott, Moya Brennan, Charlie Landsborough, Patrick Sheehy, Lumiere and the Scottish Glasgow Gospel Choir. The track was produced by John Reynolds and Tim Oliver and mastered at Soundmastwers, London. Tesco Ireland, Beaumex Ireland and Believe Digital distributed the single online and it was made available in Tesco stores through Ireland. The proceeds would go to build an Irish national monument for the Magdalene women.

See also
List of anti-war songs
That Lucky Old Sun
Ol' Man River

References

External links

"From a Distance" at Songfacts
Video of Julie Gold's Grammy Acceptance 
"From a Distance" awakens space shuttle astronauts

1985 songs
1980s ballads
1990 singles
Bette Midler songs
Cliff Richard songs
Kathy Mattea songs
Nanci Griffith songs
Grammy Award for Song of the Year
Anti-war songs
Songs against racism and xenophobia
Songs written by Julie Gold
Pop ballads
Rock ballads
Country ballads
Atlantic Records singles
EMI Records singles
MCA Records singles